Arthur William Hummel Jr. (birth name Arthur Millbourne Hummel; June 1, 1920 – February 6, 2001) was a United States diplomat.

Early life
He was born in Fenzhou, Shanxi, China, to Christian missionaries Arthur W. Hummel Sr. (1884–1975) and Ruth Bookwalter Hummel. His family moved to Beijing when he was 4. In 1927, when he was 7, the disruption and anti-foreign violence of the Northern Expedition forced his family to relocate to Massachusetts. When he was 8, his parents moved to Washington, D.C., where his father worked as Chief of the Orientalia Division at the Library of Congress. His parents sent him to Westtown School, a Quaker boarding school outside Philadelphia, for high school, where he graduated in 1938. He then attended Antioch College in Yellow Springs, Ohio, earning a B.A in 1940. In the same year, he then returned to Beijing to study at the California College of Chinese Studies and to study Chinese, since he had forgotten what he had learned as a child. He also taught English at the Catholic University of Peking.

Peaceful study in the ancient capital did not last long, however. After the attack on Pearl Harbor Hummel was taken by the Japanese and interned at the Weihsien Internment Camp in Shandong Province. Though food was not adequate, life at the camp was relatively relaxed, since it was far from the battle-front. Hummel was put in charge of the hospital laboratory, taking advantage of his college training. One of his fellow internees was Langdon Gilkey, who later became a well-known theologian. In 1944 he and Laurance Tipton,  a British prisoner, escaped and joined a unit of the Nationalist guerrillas  who fought against the Japanese.   After World War II ended, he worked with the United Nations Relief and Rehabilitation Administration, an organization which helped rebuild China along with other countries needing aid after the war. Hummel then attended the University of Chicago, graduating with a master's degree in International Studies in 1949.

Career
Arthur Hummel joined the United States Foreign Service in 1950.  In 1960, Hummel attended the National War College. He was director of Voice of America from 1961 to 1963. He served after that as Deputy Chief of Mission at the U.S. Embassy in Taiwan before being appointed to the position of United States Ambassador to Burma in 1968. He left his post on July 22, 1971, to become United States Ambassador to Ethiopia from 1975 to 1976. He also was Assistant Secretary of State for East Asian and Pacific Affairs from 1976 to 1977. On June 8, 1977, he was appointed United States Ambassador to Pakistan, where he served until 1981. He was United States Ambassador to China from 1981 to 1985. He then joined the third and final United States-China communiqué as a negotiator where he helped the U.S. reaffirm their ties with the People's Republic of China.

Retirement
After retiring from the U.S. Department of the State, he acted as the director of the Hopkins-Nanjing Center for Chinese and American Studies. Hummel died on February 6, 2001, in his home in Chevy Chase, Maryland, at the age of 80.

Notes

References

External links

1920 births
2001 deaths
Ambassadors of the United States to Myanmar
Ambassadors of the United States to Ethiopia
Ambassadors of the United States to Pakistan
Ambassadors of the United States to China
United States Career Ambassadors
People from Chevy Chase, Maryland
Children of American missionaries in China
United States Foreign Service personnel
Assistant Secretaries of State for East Asian and Pacific Affairs
Antioch College alumni
Westtown School alumni